Manuela Medina (1780-1822) was a national heroine who fought on the forefront of combat during the Mexican War of Independence.  She was a Native American from Texcoco.

She fought with José María Morelos and was not only a soldier in the army but an officer. She was the first captain of the rebel forces to lead her troops into royalist fire and succeeded against the royalist soldiers. The last of her seven battles was in early 1821 where she was wounded twice.  She eventually died of these wounds in 1822. She is mentioned in Mexican elementary school textbooks issued by the Secretariat of Education (SEP) as a heroine of the independence movement.

References

 Secretaría de Educación Pública. Comisión Nacional de Libros de Texto Gratuitos. (2007) (en español). Historia. Cuarto Grado. .

1780 births
1822 deaths
Women in 19th-century warfare
People of the Mexican War of Independence
Women in the Mexican War of Independence
19th-century Mexican women
19th-century Mexican people
18th-century Mexican women
People from Texcoco, State of Mexico
Women in Mexico
18th-century Mexican people